Death Mills (or Die Todesmühlen) is a 1945 American-German propaganda film directed by Billy Wilder and produced by the United States Department of War. The film was intended for German audiences to educate them about the atrocities committed by the Nazi regime. For the German version, Die Todesmühlen, Hanuš Burger is credited as the writer and director, while Wilder supervised the editing. Wilder is credited with directing the English-language version, however he later said that he didn't direct anything as "there was nothing to direct".

The film is a much-abbreviated version of German Concentration Camps Factual Survey, a 1945 British government documentary that was not completed until nearly seven decades later.

The German-language version of the film was shown in the US sector of West Germany in January 1946.

Synopsis 

The film opens with a note that the following is "a reminder that behind the curtain of Nazi pageants and parades was millions of men, women and children who were tortured to deaththe greatest mass murder in human history," then fades into German civilians at Gardelegen carrying crosses to the local concentration camp.

Most of the film includes footage of the newly liberated camps over a score of stark classical music. The narrator notes that people of all nationalities were found in the camps, including people of all religious or political creeds. There is no mention of the particular fate of Jewish people. The film states that 20 million people were killed and describes many of the now familiar aspects of the Holocaust, including the medical experiments and the gas chambers.

The Orson Welles film The Stranger uses footage of this film during the scene where Edward G. Robinson explains to Mary about Franz Kindler's responsibility for the Holocaust. This film would be included as a supplement on the Kino Lorber Blu-Ray of The Stranger.

Concentration camps

The images from the camps include shots of piles of skeletal corpses, naked skeletal survivors (often supported by fellow prisoners) together with footage of prosperous-looking German citizens being forced to observe their suffering. Some are also forced to carry the corpses to be buried, although most of this work was usually carried out by ex-camp guards (as at Belsen concentration camp).

There are shots of mass graves, as well as of individual burials, as at Hadamar, now known to be a euthanasia or Action T4 centre. Some of the footage appears to be of Soviet origin, and includes shots taken at Majdanek death camp which was one of the first camps to be liberated in 1944 by the Red Army. There are shots of the crematoria at several camps, as well as the infamous slogans erected at the entrances of most camps, such as Arbeit macht frei.

Perhaps most moving of all are the piles of stolen personal belongings of gassed victims, filmed by the Russians when they liberated Auschwitz, as well as by US troops at Buchenwald. They include piles of clothes, shoes, toys, wedding rings and gold teeth destined for the vaults of the Reichsbank.

See also 
 German Concentration Camps Factual Survey
 List of Holocaust films
 The Nuremberg Trials – Soviet film about the Nuremberg trials
 That Justice Be Done – American film about the Nuremberg trials

References

External links 
 
 
 Complete film at US Holocaust Museum
 

1946 films
1940s German-language films
Films directed by Billy Wilder
Documentary films about the Holocaust
Articles containing video clips
American black-and-white films
American documentary films
1946 documentary films
1940s English-language films
1940s American films